The 2004 Elf Renault Clio Cup United Kingdom season began at Thruxton on 10 April and finished after 20 races over 10 events at Donington Park on 26 September. The Championship was won by Paul Rivett driving for Boulevard Team Racing.

The season was marred by the death of Kevin Lloyd at the May Thruxton meeting.

Teams & Drivers
All competitors raced in Renault Clio Cup 182s.

Season Calendar
All races were held in the United Kingdom.

Drivers' Championship

† Kevin Lloyd was fatally injured in an accident during Round 9 at Thruxton.

External links
 Official website
 ClioCup.com
 Timing Solutions Ltd.

Renault Clio Cup
Renault Clio Cup UK seasons